James Arthur Brooks (February 4, 1889 – January 1, 1962) was a Canadian ice hockey goaltender. He played two games each for the Toronto Blueshirts and the Montreal Canadiens in the National Hockey Association (NHA) and the Toronto Arenas in the National Hockey League (NHL) between 1916 and 1919. The 1918 team won the Stanley Cup, however Brooks was released and was not a member of the winning team.

Playing career
Born in Guelph, Ontario, Brooks played junior hockey for the Guelph Lyons of the Ontario Hockey Association (OHA) in 1906–07. He turned professional with the Duquesne Athletic Club of the Western Pennsylvania Hockey League in 1908–09. He moved to Owen Sound, Ontario and played amateur hockey with the Owen Sound Seniors of the OHA until 1914, when he enlisted in the military. He left the military in 1916 and joined the Toronto Blueshirts of the NHA in their 1916–17 shortened season. The following year the Blueshirts were given to the Toronto Arena Company to operate and Brooks played four games for Toronto in their Stanley Cup-winning season, although he was released from the club when the club signed Hap Holmes. Brooks was the goalie for Toronto in the first-ever NHL game, a 10–9 loss to the Montreal Wanderers, and the following three games. He retired after the season.

Career statistics

Regular season and playoffs

Transactions
 November 1, 1908 – Signed as a free agent by Pittsburgh (WPHL)
 January 8, 1917 – Suspended by USAHA for signing amateur contract with NY Irish Americans (AAHL).
 January 30, 1917 – Signed as a free agent by Toronto (NHA).
 February 11, 1917 – Claimed by Montreal Canadiens (NHA) from Toronto (NHA) in dispersal draft.
 December 15, 1917 – Signed as a free agent by Toronto (NHL).

Source:

References

External links
 

1889 births
1962 deaths
Canadian ice hockey goaltenders
Duquesne Athletic Club players
Ice hockey people from Ontario
Montreal Canadiens (NHA) players
Sportspeople from Guelph
Toronto Arenas players
Toronto Blueshirts players